Tuamotuichthys is a genus of viviparous brotula that lives in the Pacific Ocean.

Species
There are currently three recognized species in this genus:
 Tuamotuichthys bispinosus Møller, Schwarzhans & J. G. Nielsen, 2004 (Two-spined slopebrotula)
 Tuamotuichthys marshallensis J. G. Nielsen, Schwarzhans, Møller & J. E. Randall, 2006 (Marshall slopebrotula)
 Tuamotuichthys schwarzhansi J. G. Nielsen & Møller, 2008

References

Bythitidae